Leppe Island is the ice-covered island in the Barcroft group of Biscoe Islands in Antarctica 1 km long in west-southwest to east-northeast direction and 430 m wide. Its surface area is 27.17 ha.

The feature is named after the Chilean biologist Marcelo Leppe Cartes, director of the Chilean Antarctic Institute, for his support for the Bulgarian Antarctic programme.

Location
British mapping in 1976.

Maps
 British Antarctic Territory. Scale 1:200000 topographic map. DOS 610 Series, Sheet W 66 66. Directorate of Overseas Surveys, UK, 1976
 Antarctic Digital Database (ADD). Scale 1:250000 topographic map of Antarctica. Scientific Committee on Antarctic Research (SCAR). Since 1993, regularly upgraded and updated

See also
 List of Antarctic and subantarctic islands

Notes

References
 Bulgarian Antarctic Gazetteer. Antarctic Place-names Commission. (details in Bulgarian, basic data in English)

External links
 Leppe Island. Adjusted Copernix satellite image

Islands of the Biscoe Islands
Bulgaria and the Antarctic